is a railway station on the Iida Line in the town of Tatsuno, Kamiina District, Nagano, Japan, operated by Central Japan Railway Company (JR Central).

Lines
Haba Station is served by the Iida Line and is 191.6 kilometers from the starting point of the line at Toyohashi Station.

Station layout
The station consists of two ground-level opposed side platforms connected by a level crossing. The station is unattended.

Platforms

Adjacent stations

History
Haba Station opened on 28 December 1909. With the privatization of Japanese National Railways (JNR) on 1 April 1987, the station came under the control of JR Central. The current station building was completed in 1999.

Passenger statistics
In fiscal 2016, the station was used by an average of 188 passengers daily (boarding passengers only).

Surrounding area

See also
 List of railway stations in Japan

References

External links

 Haba Station information 

Railway stations in Nagano Prefecture
Railway stations in Japan opened in 1909
Stations of Central Japan Railway Company
Iida Line
Tatsuno, Nagano